The following television stations operate on virtual channel 37 in the United States:
 WNWT-LD in New York City
 KSLM-LD in Salem, Oregon

References 

36 virtual